The 1925 Galloway by-election was a by-election held for the British House of Commons constituency of Galloway in Scotland on 17 November 1925.  The by-election was won by the Unionist Party candidate Sidney Streatfeild.

Vacancy 
The Unionist MP Vice-Admiral Sir Arthur Henniker-Hughan had died on 4 October 1925. He had held the seat since gaining it from the Liberals at the 1924 general election;

History
The constituency was created for the 1918 general election, at which a Coalition Government supporting, couponed, sitting Liberal MP was returned unopposed. At the following General Election in 1922, after the Coalition Government had ended, a Liberal beat a Unionist and in 1923, the sitting Liberal was returned unopposed.

Candidates 
The Unionist candidate was 31-year-old company director, Captain Sidney Streatfeild, who had previously contested the City of Durham constituency at the 1924 general election.

The Liberal Party candidate was 40-year-old local farmer, Major Cecil Dudgeon, (Portrait) who had held the seat from 1922 until his defeat in 1924 by Henniker-Hughan.

The Labour Party, which had never before contested the constituency, decided to intervene and fielded as candidate, John Mitchell.

Campaign
Polling Day was fixed for 17 November 1925, 43 days after the death of the previous member, allowing for a long campaign.

Result 
On an increased turnout, Streatfeild held the seat for the Unionists, with a reduced majority of 928 votes. The Labour candidate finished third, splitting the anti-Unionist vote enough to deny the Liberal victory;

Aftermath
At the following General Election in 1929, Dudgeon gained the seat for the Liberals;

See also
Galloway (UK Parliament constituency)
Galloway
List of United Kingdom by-elections (1918–1931)

Notes

References 
 

By-elections to the Parliament of the United Kingdom in Scottish constituencies
1925 in Scotland
1920s elections in Scotland
1925 elections in the United Kingdom
Politics of Dumfries and Galloway
History of Galloway
November 1925 events